Stigmella hemargyrella is a moth of the family Nepticulidae. It is found in most of Europe, except Iceland, Norway, Finland, Portugal and most of the Baltic region.

The moths (imago) are bivoltine flying from April to May and again from July to August and can be found resting on trunks. The wingspan is 5–6 mm. The head is light ochreous-yellowish. Antennal eyecaps whitish. Forewings deep shining bronzy; a golden-tinged silvery-metallic hardly oblique fascia at 2/3; apical area beyond this dark purple-fuscous; cilia round apex beyond a blackish median line white. Hindwings rather dark grey.

The egg can be laid on either side of the leaf and the pale yellowish-white larva feed, within a mine on Fagus sylvatica and Fagus sylvatica orientalis. The mine is a sinuous gallery and at the early state is relatively narrow with a central line of dark frass. As the larva grow the mine becomes wider and in the middle portion the frass is arranged in a series of arcs or coils. The mine can cross the vein (compare Stigmella tityrella which rarely crosses the veins) and in the final stages of the mine the frass is more irregular and concentrated in the centre of the gallery.

References

External links
 bladmineerders.nl
 UKmoths
 Fauna Europaea
 Swedish moths
 Stigmella hemargyrella images at Consortium for the Barcode of Life
 

Nepticulidae
Moths described in 1832
Moths of Europe
Taxa named by Vincenz Kollar